Pääjärvi is a medium-sized lake of Finland. It belongs to the Kymijoki main catchment area. It is located in Karstula in the region of Keski-Suomi. All named islands inside are Kirkkosaari, Vuohisaari, Unikonsaari, Niittysaari, Karjasaari, Hermanninsaari, Sikosaari, Korpisaari, Kivikonsaari, Parkinluoto, Kertosaari, Ellunsaari, Tuomaansaari, Taikinasaari, Nuttura and Männikkösaari.

The north part of the lake belongs to the Natura 2000 environment protection program (number FI0900141).

See also
List of lakes in Finland

References

Landforms of Central Finland
Lakes of Karstula